

Offseason 
 November 18, 1982: Ed Whitson was traded by the Indians to the San Diego Padres for Broderick Perkins and Juan Eichelberger.
 December 9, 1982: Von Hayes was traded by the Indians to the Philadelphia Phillies for Manny Trillo, Jay Baller, Julio Franco, George Vukovich, and Jerry Willard.
 December 15, 1982: Rick Manning was signed as a free agent by the Indians.

Regular season

Season standings

Record vs. opponents

Notable transactions 
 April 1, 1983: Jerry Dybzinski was traded by the Indians to the Chicago White Sox for Pat Tabler.
 June 6, 1983: Rick Manning and Rick Waits were traded by the Indians to the Milwaukee Brewers for Gorman Thomas, Ernie Camacho and Jamie Easterly.
 August 17, 1983: Manny Trillo was traded by the Indians to the Montreal Expos for Don Carter (minors) and $300,000.

Opening Day Lineup

Roster

Player stats

Batting
Note: G = Games played; AB = At bats; R = Runs scored; H = Hits; 2B = Doubles; 3B = Triples; HR = Home runs; RBI = Runs batted in; AVG = Batting average; SB = Stolen bases

Pitching
Note: W = Wins; L = Losses; ERA = Earned run average; G = Games pitched; GS = Games started; SV = Saves; IP = Innings pitched; R = Runs allowed; ER = Earned runs allowed; BB = Walks allowed; K = Strikeouts

Awards and honors 

All-Star Game

Farm system

Notes

References 
1983 Cleveland Indians team at Baseball-Reference
1983 Cleveland Indians team page at www.baseball-almanac.com

Cleveland Guardians seasons
Cleveland Indians season
Cleve